Tambla is a municipality in the Honduran department of Lempira.

It is one of the municipalities of the Lempira department. To arrive to its municipality capital is better to go via Santa Rosa de Copán-San Marcos de Ocotepeque-Cololaca-Tambla.

History 

At the beginning it was located at "El Zorrillal" village, because of the dryness of the land, all the people decided to move to another place. It was then located at a place known as "Pueblo Viejo". In the census of 1887, it was a village of Tomalá. The administration of Policarpo Bonilla issued the decree stating that the creation of the municipality was on 11 September 1896.

Geography 

It is situated at the top of a mountain. There are also huge mountains around the municipality capital. All of these are covered with pine forests. The weather is very cool all year long, except during the summer, when the temperature increases slightly.

Boundaries 
Its boundaries are: 
North : Tomalá municipality.
South : Guarita and Valladolid municipalities.
East  : San Andrés and Tomalá municipalities.
West  : Guarita municipality.
Surface Extents: 59 km²

Resources 

It is one of the many municipalities proper for coffee plantations. Obviously they take advantage of the elevation from sea level. The next activity is raising cattle followed by beans and corn crops. The commerce is a very important economical activity as well. As the rest of the department it has electricity in the municipality capital and mobile communications coverage.

Population 
Population: the figure was 2,314 people back in 2001, for the year of 2015 the figure is expected to increase up to 3,221.
Villages: 4
Settlements: 40

Demographics
At the time of the 2013 Honduras census, Tambla municipality had a population of 3,089. Of these, 67.92% were Mestizo, 27.58% Indigenous (27.42% Lenca), 4.11% White and 0.39% Black or Afro-Honduran.

Tourism 

It takes about 2 hr, the road up to Cololaca is being paved, but once one passes Cololaca the road is in very good conditions. There are some curves that are narrow, so caution is advised to avoid accidents. It is only 10 minutes away from Tomalá municipality. This municipality has several good attractions. Starting for a statue and plaque in honour of Lempira chief. Next could be a very old "Ceiba" tree on one side of the road to Valladolid. The people there are very friendly and always willing to tell the story of their town and some more. The groceries stores and electricity make the visit more comfortable. This is also a very quite town to have a break from the noise of the city.
Local Holidays: "San Francisco de Asis" day on 4 October and "Inmaculada Concepción" day on 8 December.

References

External links

Municipalities of the Lempira Department